Aksel Ivanovich Berg (– 9 July 1979) was a Soviet scientist in radio-frequency engineering and Soviet Navy Admiral, Hero of Socialist Labour. He was a key figure in the introduction of cybernetics to the Soviet Union.

Early life
Berg's father was General Johan (Ivan) Berg, of Finland-Swedish origin, and his mother was Italian. Aksel was 11 when his father died, and Aksel was matriculated to Saint Petersburg navy school. Berg joined the Imperial Russian Navy in 1914 and served as junior navigating officer on the Russian battleship Tsesarevich and as liaison officer on the British submarine HMS E8, which was operating in the Baltic in alliance with Russia.

Soviet times

Before the German-Soviet war
After the revolution Berg served in the Red Navy 1918–22. In 1918 he participated in the Ice Cruise of the Baltic Fleet. In 1919 he was navigating officer on the submarine Pantera when it sank the British destroyer HMS Vittoria. He subsequently commanded the submarines Rys, Volk and Zmeya. From 1925 Berg was based onshore and completed his education at the Saint Petersburg Polytechnical University. From 1927 he was assigned to the navy radio electronics department and from 1932 to 1937 he headed the Navy Communications Research Institute.

Imprisoned and rehabilitated
During Stalin's purges, Berg was imprisoned for three years, but was freed and rehabilitated in 1940, when Stalin became interested in developing radar. Berg was immediately appointed as minister of electronic technology of the USSR. He developed the Redut-K air-warning radar which was placed aboard the light cruiser Molotov in April 1941. Molotov´s device enabled her to play a key role in the air defense of Sevastopol in the first stages of Operation Barbarossa.

After the war
After the war Berg directed the Radioelectronics Institute 1947–57 and was a Deputy Minister of Defence 1953–57. Then in 1958 he founded and led the Scientific Council on Complex Problems in Cybernetics. His main interests were radiolocation, microelectronics and cybernetics (i.e. computer science and radio-frequency engineering).

Death
Aksel Berg died in Moscow in 1979 and is buried at Novodevichy Cemetery.

Selected publications
Berg A., (1964), 'Cybernetics and Education' in The Anglo-Soviet Journal, March 1964, pp. 13–20 (English language)

Honours and awards
 Hero of Socialist Labour (10 November 1963) Decree of the Presidium of the Supreme Soviet "for outstanding achievements in the development of radio engineering and in connection with the 70th anniversary of Aksel Ivanovich Berg"
 Four Orders of Lenin
 Order of the October Revolution
 Order of the Red Banner, twice
 Order of the Patriotic War, 1st class
 Order of the Red Star, three times
 Popov Gold Medal (13 April 1951)
 Medal "For the Victory over Germany in the Great Patriotic War 1941–1945"
 Jubilee Medal "Twenty Years of Victory in the Great Patriotic War 1941-1945"
 Jubilee Medal "XX Years of the Workers' and Peasants' Red Army"
 Jubilee Medal "30 Years of the Soviet Army and Navy"
 Jubilee Medal "40 Years of the Armed Forces of the USSR"
 Jubilee Medal "50 Years of the Armed Forces of the USSR"

References

External links

 

1893 births
1979 deaths
People from Orenburg
People from Orenburgsky Uyezd
Soviet people of Finnish descent
Soviet people of Italian descent
Communist Party of the Soviet Union members
Soviet admirals
Imperial Russian Navy officers
Soviet submarine commanders
Soviet scientists
Peter the Great St. Petersburg Polytechnic University alumni
Full Members of the USSR Academy of Sciences
Soviet prisoners and detainees
Soviet rehabilitations
Russian military personnel of World War I
Soviet military personnel of the Russian Civil War
Soviet people of World War II
Heroes of Socialist Labour
Recipients of the Order of Lenin
Recipients of the Order of the Red Banner
Burials at Novodevichy Cemetery